Phylidonyris is a genus of birds in the honeyeater family that are endemic to Australia.

It contains the following species:

References

 
Bird genera